The Labour Law of the People's Republic of China is a law of China which has been enforced since 1995. It was promulgated by the Standing Committee of the National People's Congress of China on July 5, 1994, and came into effect on January 1, 1995.

This Labour Law is the basic labour law of China. It's easily confused with the Labour Contract Law of the People's Republic of China because of similar names and unprecise media reports. Sometimes it's called the old labour contract law, which is an incorrect statement.

Contents of the law 
The law has 107 articles in 13 chapters. The titles of all the chapters are listed below.
 General Provisions
 Promotion of Employment
 Labour Contracts and Collective Contracts
 Working Hours, Rests, and Leaves
 Wages
 Labour Safety and Sanitation
 Special Protection for Female Staff and Workers and Juvenile Workers
 Professional Training
 Social Insurance and Welfare Treatment
 Labour Disputes
 Supervision and Inspection
 Legal Responsibilities
 Supplementary Provisions

The purpose of the law, stated by Article 1 in the first chapter, is to "protect the legitimate rights and interests of labourers, readjust labour relationship, establish and safeguard the labour system suiting the socialist market economy, and promote economic development and social progress".

There are 20 articles concerning labour contracts and collective contracts in the third chapter. In 2008, the 98-article-long Labour Contract Law came into effect to further regulate related behaviours.

Later amendment 

The law was amended with minor correction in 2009.

Criticism from the public 

The law is widely criticised for its defects. This is one of the reasons for the promulgation of the Labour Contract Law which came into effect on January 1, 2008. For example, though collective contract has been put into laws for more than 15 years, collective bargaining is not doing well in China. The term collective negotiation first appeared in laws in 2007, instead of collective bargaining, which is less decisive than the latter.

Related laws 
This is a list of related Chinese laws, but does not cover every law related.

 Labour Contract Law of the People's Republic of China
 Trade Union Law of the People's Republic of China
 Law of the People's Republic of China on Labour Dispute Mediation and Arbitration
 Employment Promotion Law of the People's Republic of China
 Law of the People's Republic of China on the Protection of Women's Rights and Interests
 Production Safety Law of the People's Republic of China
 Law of the People's Republic of China on Promoting Clean Production
 Law of the People's Republic of China on the Prevention and Treatment of Occupational Diseases

References

External links 
"Labour Law of the People's Republic of China" by Ministry of Commerce of the People's Republic of China.
"中华人民共和国劳动法" in Chinese, by the Law Database of the National People's Congress.

Laws of China
Labor relations in China
Chinese labour law